is a Japanese football club from Fukushima City, the capital of Fukushima Prefecture. They currently play in the J3 League, Japan's third tier of professional football.

History 
The club was founded in 2006, by the merger of FC Pelada Fukushima and Junkers. From the 2008 season, the club has adopted the new name as "Fukushima United FC". They played in the Japan Football League, the third tier of the Japanese football league system in 2013. Starting in 2014, they were promoted to the newly formed, J3 League.

On 28 October 2022, Fukushima United acquired the J2 license, meaning that from the 2022 season, they can now be promoted to the J2 League if the club finishes the league season either on 1st or 2nd place.

League and cup record 

Key

Honours 
 Tohoku Soccer League Division 1
 Champions (2): 2011, 2012

Current squad 
As of 19 January 2023.

Out on loan

Coaching staff
For the 2023 season.

Managerial history

Kit evolution

References

External links 
Official Site

 
Football clubs in Japan
Fukushima United FC managers
Sports teams in Fukushima Prefecture
2002 establishments in Japan
Japan Football League clubs
J.League clubs
Association football clubs established in 2002